Permanent Vacation is a dark comedy film written, directed, and produced by W. Scott Peake and is based upon the novel, What We Did On Our Holidays by Geoff Nicholson. Permanent Vacation is Scott's first feature film after a career in directing commercials and music videos. It was shot on 35mm film.

Plot
Eric Bury, a mild mannered Englishman, is told by his boss that he must take a mandatory vacation to ease his workaholic ways. After a brief family meeting to discuss possible scenarios, Eric decides on a "family camping trip", as this may be the last vacation with his teenage children before they leave the nest. So he takes his wife, daughter and son on a camping holiday to Florida.  Once the family arrives at Adventures Unlimited Campground in Florida, Eric is plunged into a world of escalating sexual debauchery, religious ecstasy, human sacrifice, sadistic policemen, dwarves and one philosophizing old man, as this dark comedy takes the family on an outlandish ride.

Eric, a cheerful soul, tries to see the best in everything, however, the unexplained events at the Adventures Unlimited Campground come in quick, nightmarish succession and their bizarre residents push Eric's fragile patience to its edge as he tries to keep his family together.

His obnoxious crazy neighbors, Alex and Iris Garcia, begin to slowly wear on Eric's nerves. Iris’ flagrant sexual advances toward Eric seem innocuous enough, and at first flatters Eric, but when the late night loud music turns into tequila, gunshot mornings with Alex, Eric tries to take matters into his own hands to end the madness.

Then along comes a relentless cop, who seems to be at Eric's every turn tormenting him.  Eric is helpless as he watches his family quickly fall apart. His son Max turns feral and attempts to make a human sacrifice of him, and his daughter Sally wanders off with a traveling gospel revival.  When his wife Kathleen decides to fulfill her sexual fantasies, which includes one with a pair of motorcycling dwarves, Eric tries to find solace in the company of a wise old man but even his views become too outrageous for Eric.  Finally, Eric has had enough.  With his constitution fractured, Eric exorcises his demons by embarking on a maniacal journey, which leaves little in his path.

Cast
Cast:
Frank Harper (Eric Bury)
David Carradine (Old Man)
Gina Bellman (Kathleen Bury)
Charles Shaughnessy (Mr. Wilkinson)
Michael Bowen (Det. Hollerenshaw)
Victor Varnado (Stutter Boy)
Alex Reymundo (Alex Garcia)
Kamala Lopez-Dawson (Iris Garcia)
Phoebe Thomas (Sally Bury)
Jonathan Bailey (Max Bury)

Production
Permanent Vacation was shot in 35mm entirely on location in Milton, Florida at the campground Adventures Unlimited.  Over 90% of the crew is all alumni of the Film School at Florida State University, where Scott received his MFA in 1993.  The Los Angeles-based band Skeeter Truck performed several songs on the soundtrack.

Awards and film festival
SoCal Independent Film Festival 2007	Winner – Best Actor Frank Harper

Availability
The film was released on DVD in January 2009 by Vanguard Cinema and contains several extra features including a behind the scenes/making of documentary, director commentary, deleted scenes, slideshow and trailer.

External links
 Official Website

References

2007 films
Films about vacationing
2000s English-language films